Henry Stephen Rzepa (born 1950) is a chemist and Emeritus Professor of Computational chemistry at  Imperial College London.

Education
Rzepa was born in London in 1950, was educated at Wandsworth Comprehensive School, and then entered the chemistry department at  Imperial College London where he graduated in 1971. He stayed to do a Ph.D.  on the physical organic chemistry of indoles supervised by Brian Challis.

Career and research
After spending three years doing postdoctoral research at the University of Texas at Austin, Texas with  Michael Dewar in the then emerging field of computational chemistry, he returned to  Imperial College after being appointed a lecturer. He was one of the first to be appointed in the  UK in the emerging subject of computational organic chemistry.  he is Emeritus Professor of Computational Chemistry.

His research interests directed towards combining different types of chemical information tools for solving structural, mechanistic and stereochemical problems in organic, bioorganic, organometallic chemistry and catalysis, using techniques such as semiempirical molecular orbital methods (the MNDO family), Nuclear Magnetic Resonance (NMR) spectroscopy,  X-ray crystallography and ab initio quantum theories. Aware of the complex semantic  issues involved in converging different areas of chemistry to address modern multidisciplinary problems,  he started investigating the use of the Internet as an information and integrating medium around  1987, focusing in 1994 on the World Wide Web as having the most potential. Peter Murray-Rust and he first introduced Chemical Markup Language (CML) in 1995 as a rich  carrier of semantic chemical information and data; and they coined the  term Datument as a portmanteau word  to better express the evolution from the  documents produced by traditional academic publishing methods  to the Semantic Web ideals expressed by Tim Berners-Lee.

His contributions to chemistry include exploration of  Möbius aromaticity, highlighted by the theoretical discovery of relatively stable forms of cyclic conjugated molecules which exhibit two and higher half-twists  in the topology rather than just the single twist associated with Mobius systems (and hence possibly better termed Johann Benedict Listing rings). He is responsible for unraveling the mechanistic origins of stereocontrol in  a variety of catalytic polymerisation reactions, including that of lactide to polylactide, a new generation of bio-sustainable polymer not dependent on oil. He is also known for the  integration of  chemistry  (in the form of CML) with latest Internet technologies such as  RSS and Podcasting, for the introduction of the  Chemical MIME types in 1994 and for, the first electronic-only conferences in organic chemistry, which ran from 1995-1998.

Awards and honours
Rzepa was awarded the Herman Skolnik Award in 2012 by the American Chemical Society.

References

Academics of Imperial College London
Living people
British chemists
Theoretical chemists
1950 births
Computational chemists
Alumni of Imperial College London